Athena Lee may refer to:

 Athena Lee (born 1964), American musician
 Athena Lee Yen (born 1981), Taiwanese actress
 Athena Lee (markswoman), American competition shooter

See also

 Lee (disambiguation)
 Athena (disambiguation)